Grzegorz Lindenberg (born September 26, 1955) is a Polish journalist and sociologist. He is one of the co-founders of Gazeta Wyborcza, former General Director of Agora, founder and first editor-in-chief of Super Express, and one of founders of a right-wing anti-immigration website Euroislam.pl. He was also the president of two online businesses (SuperMedia in 1996 and eCard in 2000).

Biography 
In 1979 he obtained a degree in sociology. In 1985 he obtained a PhD Degree at the Institute of Sociology at the University of Warsaw. In the years 1985–1987 he was a researcher working at the Russian Research Center at Harvard University as part of a scholarship from the Kościuszko Foundation and a lecturer at the University of Boston.

From 1996 to 2004, he was a board member of the Stefan Batory Foundation in Warsaw.

Since 2001, he is an independent consultant.

He is a brother to Jarosław Lindenberg.

Novels 

 Zmiana społeczna a świadomość polityczna, Warsaw 1986
 Świadomość społeczna wobec kryzysu i konfliktu społecznego (co-author; Krzysztof Nowak), Warsaw 1987
 Anna Maria Goławska, Toskania i okolice: przewodnik subiektywny (photography author), Warsaw 2006 
 Goławska, Anna Maria, and Grzegorz Lindenberg. Włochy: podróż na południe. Warszawa: Wydawnictwo Nowy Świat, 2010.
 Ludzkość poprawiona. Jak najbliższe lata zmienią świat w którym żyjemy, Wydawnictwo Otwarte, Warsaw 2018 
Wzbierająca fala. Europa wobec eksplozji demograficznej w Afryce, Fundacja Instytut Dyplomacji Europejskiej, Warsaw 2019 ISBN 9788395389108

References

External links
 Grzegorz Lindenberg personal website

Living people
1955 births
Place of birth missing (living people)
Polish journalists
20th-century newspaper founders
University of Warsaw alumni